Kim Nam-sun (born 25 July 1970) is a South Korean volleyball player. She competed in the women's tournament at the 1996 Summer Olympics.

References

1970 births
Living people
South Korean women's volleyball players
Olympic volleyball players of South Korea
Volleyball players at the 1996 Summer Olympics
Place of birth missing (living people)
Asian Games medalists in volleyball
Volleyball players at the 1994 Asian Games
Volleyball players at the 2002 Asian Games
Medalists at the 1994 Asian Games
Medalists at the 2002 Asian Games
Asian Games gold medalists for South Korea
Asian Games silver medalists for South Korea